Jack Eaton (June 16, 1888 – December 4, 1968) was an American film producer and director. He produced 78 films between 1918 and 1953. He also directed 38 films between 1918 and 1953. He was nominated for five Academy Awards, all for Best Short Subject, winning once, in 1950, for Aquatic House Party. He died in Mystic, Connecticut. Eaton's short film White Rhapsody was preserved by the Academy Film Archive, in conjunction with the UCLA Film and Television Archive, in 2013.

Selected filmography
 Amphibious Fighters (1943)
 Aquatic House Party (1949)

References

External links

1888 births
1968 deaths
People from Mystic, Connecticut
Film directors from Connecticut
Film producers from Connecticut